Eastside, sometimes known as the State Streets, is a large neighborhood in Flint, Michigan.  It is not to be confused with East Flint in which it resides.  The neighborhood is bounded on the west by University Park and Buick City, the north by the Northeast Side, the east by Thrift City, and the south by East Village.  The neighborhood is anchored on the north and south by two large parks, Whaley and Kearsley, and is also the site of Washington and Williams Elementary Schools, and formerly Homedale Elementary.

Location 

The most commonly given boundaries, established by the Olde Eastside Neighbors, are the Flint River to the west, Dort Highway to the east, Whaley Park to the north, and Robert T. Longway to the south.  "State Streets" is drawn from the name of twenty streets that bisect the center of the neighborhood from north to south.

History 

Since 1904, the Eastside has been located adjacent to General Motors North Flint facilities, including Buick City.  While subdivisions such as Civic Park and The East Village were originally designed as "bedroom neighborhoods" at some distance from the factories, the Eastside was built as a lower-income community from the beginning.  This is demonstrated by the housing stock which consists almost strictly of wood-frame bungalows.  Additionally, the neighborhood has been isolated from the rest of the city by the Flint River and, later, I-475 and Delphi East.  Even in Flint's halcyon decades of the 1940s and 1950s, the Eastside was not considered a prosperous neighborhood.

Problems magnified with the deindustrialization of General Motors beginning in the early 1980s.  The Eastside did not suffer from the rapid white-flight experienced across the river.  At the same time, a large portion of the original population was displaced by southern migrants, and the neighborhood has gradually diversified.

Present day 

While the Eastside is unquestionably Flint's most racially and ethnically diverse neighborhood, it has been continually plagued by gang-related violence and racial tension.  Today, the Eastside is one of Flint's most troubled neighborhoods in terms of violent crime.  Due in large part to these problems, and the affordability of housing stock, the Eastside is one of the few neighborhoods in Flint where the majority of residents are not landowners.  Mass property acquisitions have led to the concentration of residences in the hands of a few landlords.  This, combined with infrastructural degradation and the decline of Flint as a whole, have reduced property values to new lows.

There are some assets in the Eastside working against these prevailing trends.  In particular, Kearsley Park has been recently redesigned and renovated and has become a stabilizing influence on the neighborhood.  The diversity of the Eastside, essentially unprecedented in Flint, has had its most visible impact on Davison Road, as seen by such businesses as Luigi's Restaurant and the Flint Judo Club.

Significant business closures reflect tough economics, tough neighborhoods 
While its boundaries may be the Flint River to the west and Dort Highway to the east, the Eastside has Franklin Ave. as its main north-south artery and Davison Road as its main east-west artery.  Along these roads certain well established businesses, with long histories of community involvement, have contributed to the general stability of the area. However, on Davison Road, two such businesses have closed their doors within the last few years.  Brown Funeral Home closed in 2007 and Angelos Coney Island - a restaurant famous in Flint, and, in business at that location since 1949 - closed permanently in December 2018. In an interview on Michigan Public Radio the owner of Angelos Coney Island stated that the restaurant had seen declining patronage over the last few years and suggested that he believed this was a consequence of Flint's dwindling population, the city's economic malaise, concerns over water quality, and people simply being afraid to come to the Eastside.  While Angelos Coney Island was a legendary eatery in the Flint area, its property had been the site of numerous assaults and murders over the last twenty years.

References

External links
Flint, Michigan's 3rd Ward
Flint, Michigan's 4th Ward
Flint, Michigan's 5th Ward
Flint, Michigan's 7th Ward
Kearsley Park
Whaley Park

Flint, Michigan